Malang Diedhiou (born 30 April 1973) is a retired international football referee from Senegal. He has refereed matches in the 2015 Africa Cup of Nations, the 2016 Summer Olympics and the 2017 Africa Cup of Nations. He was also a video assistant referee during the 2017 FIFA Confederations Cup. Diedhiou was also a referee in the 2017 FIFA Club World Cup and the 2018 FIFA World Cup in Russia.

FIFA World Cup

References

External links
Malang Diedhiou at WorldReferee.com

Living people
1973 births
Senegalese football referees
People from Ziguinchor
2018 FIFA World Cup referees
Football referees at the 2016 Summer Olympics